Naxia is a genus of crabs in the family Majidae, containing the following species:
Naxia aries (H. Milne-Edwards, 1834)
Naxia aurita (Latreille, 1825)
Naxia spinosa (Hess, 1865)
Naxia tumida (Dana, 1851)

References 

Majoidea